= The Gold Sheet: Pro Football Analyst =

Software

The Gold Sheet: Pro Football Analyst is software published by Villa Crespo Software in 1991

== Description ==
The Gold Sheet: Pro Football Analyst is a program which presents statistics for two full football seasons, with the option to get a Statdisk containing teams going back to 1983, and users had the ability to download weekly updates or receive hard copy updates by mail.

== Reception ==
Bill Brown and Wyatt Lee reviewed the program for Computer Gaming World, and stated that "To be sure, The Gold Sheet: Pro Football Analyst is not a game, but this writer certainly felt like a Las Vegas radio personality when he finished analyzing last weekend's games. 61% accuracy may not be that good on GEnie, but it sure beats the 38% scored by one of the on-disk "experts." Anyone serious about sports and addicted to statistics will certainly want to be aware of The Gold Sheet."

Richard Jacobs for Computer Games Strategy Plus said "Gamblers will find that its array of stats and trends provide 'cause for pause' before wagering. But will this software make you rich? I wouldn't bet on it."

== Reviews ==
- VideoGames & Computer Entertainment
